STKRJ Katok 'B' or Kampong Katok 'B', also known as STKRJ Mata-Mata, is a public housing estate in Brunei-Muara District, Brunei, about  from the country's capital Bandar Seri Begawan. The total population was 6,108 in 2016. It is one of the estates for the Landless Indigenous Citizens' Housing Scheme (STKRJ), a public housing programme for the country's indigenous citizens.

Geography 
It neighbours Kampong Mata-Mata and Perpindahan Mata-Mata to the east.

It is one of the estates named after the village Kampong Katok, the other STKRJ Katok 'A'.

Administration 
For subdivision purposes, the estate is officially known as STKRJ Mata-Mata and has been divided into three areas and administered as villages:

Infrastructures

Schools 
Katok 'B' Primary School is the estate's government primary school.

Other schools located in the area include:
 Katok Secondary School — a government secondary school. It was established in 2014 and as of 2017 had 1,180 students and 121 teachers. It is housed at what was formerly Katok Sixth Form Centre, a sixth form college, whereby the latter has been relocated to a new place in Mukim Sengkurong and renamed Sengkurong Sixth Form Centre. The school complex sits on a  land and was completed in 2008 at a cost of B$16.8 million (US$12.5 million as of September 2021). Some of the facilities include 41 classrooms, laboratories, gymnasium, theatre and library. It was established to alleviate overcrowding at Menglait Secondary School.
 Raja Isteri Pengiran Anak Hajah Saleha Girls' Arabic Religious Secondary School (SUAMPRIPAHS) — a girls' government secondary school for the country's Arabic Islamic religious education. The construction began in 2015 and completed in 2017 at a cost of almost B$47 million (US$35 million as of September 2021); it can accommodate 1,800 students. The students and teachers are those relocated from Raja Isteri Pengiran Anak Damit Girls' Arabic Religious Secondary School (SUAMPRIPAD) in Batu Satu. As of 2018, it had 1,365 students and 133 teachers. It was initially known as Katok Arabic Secondary School until it was renamed on 30 January 2017 on the royal command of Sultan Hassanal Bolkiah.

However, their location address is often attributed to Kampong Katok, even though they are located outside of the village boundary.

Notes

References 

Katok 'B'